Alan John Webster (born 18 August 1941) is a former New Zealand rower.

Webster was born in Te Puke in 1941.

At the 1962 British Empire and Commonwealth Games he won the silver medal as part of the men's eight alongside crew members Leslie Arthur, Darien Boswell, Colin Cordes, Alistair Dryden, Alan Grey, Christian Larsen, Louis Lobel and Robert Page.

Webster competed at two Olympic Games, first in 1964 where he was part of the men's eight that made the quarter finals. Then in 1968 where he was again part of the men's eight that came fourth in the final.

References

External links 
 
 
 

1941 births
Living people
New Zealand male rowers
Rowers at the 1962 British Empire and Commonwealth Games
Commonwealth Games silver medallists for New Zealand
Rowers at the 1964 Summer Olympics
Rowers at the 1968 Summer Olympics
Olympic rowers of New Zealand
Commonwealth Games medallists in rowing
People from Te Puke
Sportspeople from the Bay of Plenty Region
Medallists at the 1962 British Empire and Commonwealth Games